Richard Lee Stotter (April 5, 1945 – May 4, 2015) was an American football linebacker who played one season with the Houston Oilers of the American Football League. He was drafted by the Houston Oilers in the fourteenth round of the 1968 NFL Draft. Stotter played college football at the University of Houston and attended Shaker Heights High School in Shaker Heights, Ohio. He was a Consensus All-American in 1967. He died in 2015 at age 70 in Cleveland.

References

External links
Just Sports Stats

1945 births
2015 deaths
Players of American football from Cleveland
American football offensive guards
American football linebackers
Houston Cougars football players
Houston Oilers players
All-American college football players
American Football League players